The Georgian records in swimming are the fastest ever performances of swimmers from Georgia, which are recognised and ratified by the Georgian Swimming Federation.

All records were set in finals unless noted otherwise.

Long Course (50 m)

Men

Women

Short Course (25 m)

Men

Women

References

Georgia
Swimming in Georgia (country)
Swimming
Swimming